Svetoslav Dikov (born 18 April 1992) is a Bulgarian professional footballer who plays as a forward for CSKA 1948 II.

Career

Early career
Dikov started his career from Slivnishki Geroy, before moving to Marek Dupnitsa and making his professional debut in A Group in 2014. In summer of 2015 he returned to Slivnishki Geroy.

Vereya
On 17 June 2016 Dikov signed with the newly promoted team to Bulgarian First League - Vereya. He made his debut for the team on 13 August 2016 in the local derby match against Beroe Stara Zagora, lost by 1:0.

On 27 October 2016 he scored the winning goal against Pomorie in match for the Bulgarian Cup, advancing his team to the quarterfinal.

Tsarsko Selo
In the beginning of 2017 Dikov left Vereya and started training with Botev Vratsa, but on 18 January 2017 he signed with another Bulgarian Second League team - Tsarsko Selo. He made his debut for the team on 25 February 2017 in a match against Vitosha Bistritsa and scored a goal for the 2:1 loss. On 14 April 2017 he scored two goals for the 3:0 win against Oborishte.

Dikov started the new 2017-18 season by scoring a hattrick in the first match against Nesebar. Later one of the goals was judged to have been an own goal. Dikov received a yellow card in the cup match against Botev Plovdiv from the bench as he entered the field to celebrate one of the goals. Later he scored a goal, but couldn't help his team to qualify for the next round. He also missed the next league match, the derby against Lokomotiv Sofia due to card accumulation. On 4 November he scored 2 goals against Neftochimic Burgas making him with 12 goals out of 12 played matches. Dikov become the top goalscorer in the 2017–18 season, scoring 25 goals in 27 matches.

CSKA 1948
On 17 June 2018, Dikov signed with CSKA 1948. He made his debut for the team in the first league match against Botev Galabovo. On 4 August Dikov entered as a substitute in the match against Chernomomrets Balchik and scored the winning goal in the extra time of the match.

Tabor Sežana
On 12 February 2019, NK Tabor Sežana announced the signing of Dikov from CSKA 1948.

Style of play
Dikov played mostly as a box-to-box midfielder, but in January 2017, after the injury of Simeon Ganchev, at the winter camp in Macedonia, Dikov was played as a forward in a friendly match where he scored a goal. Since then, Dikov was given the striker position at  Tsarsko Selo.

Career statistics

Club

Honours

Club

Marek Dupnitsa
 B Group (1): 2013–14

Individual
 Bulgarian Second League Top scorer (2): 2017–18 (25 goals), 2020–21 (23 goals)

References

External links
 
 

1992 births
Living people
Bulgarian footballers
Bulgarian expatriate footballers
First Professional Football League (Bulgaria) players
OFC Sliven 2000 players
PFC Marek Dupnitsa players
FC Vereya players
FC Tsarsko Selo Sofia players
FC CSKA 1948 Sofia players
FC Lokomotiv 1929 Sofia players
Sandecja Nowy Sącz players
FC Sportist Svoge players
I liga players
Association football forwards
Expatriate footballers in Poland
Bulgarian expatriate sportspeople in Poland